Peter Somerset Margesson Judd DL (born 20 February 1949) retired as Dean of Chelmsford on 6 October 2013.

Born in Calgary, Alberta, he was educated at Charterhouse and Trinity Hall, Cambridge and ordained after a period of study at Ripon College Cuddesdon in 1974. He began his ecclesiastical career as a Curate at St Philip with St Stephen, Salford after which he was Chaplain and Fellow at Clare College, Cambridge. He was Team Vicar of Hitcham and Dropmore from 1981 to 1988  and then Rural Dean of Cowley until he became Rector and Provost of Chelmsford Cathedral in 1997, and Dean in 2000.

References

1949 births
People from Calgary
People educated at Charterhouse School
Alumni of Trinity Hall, Cambridge
Alumni of Ripon College Cuddesdon
Deputy Lieutenants of Essex
Fellows of Clare College, Cambridge
Provosts and Deans of Chelmsford
Living people